Los Paquetes de Paquita ("The Packages of Paquita") is a 1955 Mexican film. It stars Carlos Orellana.

References

External links
 

1955 films
1950s Spanish-language films
Mexican black-and-white films
Mexican comedy-drama films
1955 comedy-drama films
1950s Mexican films